The 2012–13 Australian Athletics Championships was the 91st edition of the national championship in outdoor track and field for Australia. It was held from 11–14 April 2013 at the Sydney Olympic Park Athletic Centre in Sydney. It served as a selection meeting for Australia at the 2013 World Championships in Athletics. The 10,000 metres event took place separately at the Zatopek 10K on 8 December 2012 at Lakeside Stadium in Melbourne.

Medal summary

Men

Women

References

External links 
 Athletics Australia website

2013
Australian Athletics Championships
Australian Championships
Athletics Championships
Sports competitions in Sydney
2010s in Sydney